This list of skyscrapers in Taiwan ranks skyscrapers in Taiwan by height. The tallest building in Taiwan is currently the 101–story Taipei 101, which rises  and was completed in 2004. It was officially classified as the world's tallest from 2004 to 2010. Now, it is still the tallest building in Taiwan, Asia's sixth tallest building, and the world's ninth tallest building. There are currently six buildings over 200 metres under construction in Taiwan, including the Taipei Twin Tower 1, which is under planning and will reach , and the Taipei Sky Tower, which is under construction in Taipei and will reach .

Unlike many other East-Asian countries with numerous supertalls, Taiwan's skyscrapers are on average relatively shorter (Taiwan only has two supertalls as of February 2021). This is because construction is difficult since Taiwan's geographical position is, similar to Japan (which only has one supertall), located very close to the boundary between the Eurasian Plate and the Philippine Plate, thus it is prone to many earthquakes. Therefore, all buildings above  must be as earthquake-proof as possible and adhere to numerous strict structural standards set by the government to ensure safety.

Locations

Tallest Buildings in Taiwan

>
An equal sign (=) following a rank indicates the same height between two or more buildings. The "Year" column indicates the year of completion. The list includes only habitable buildings, as opposed to structures such as observation towers, radio masts, transmission towers and chimneys.

>

Tallest buildings by city in Taiwan 

Timeline of tallest buildings

Tallest Buildings under construction

Gallery

Tallest proposed or approved

See also
 Skyscraper
 List of tallest buildings
 List of tallest structures by country
 List of tallest buildings in Taipei
 List of tallest buildings in New Taipei City
 List of tallest buildings in Taoyuan City
 List of tallest buildings in Taichung
 List of tallest buildings in Kaohsiung

External links
 SkyscraperPage
 Emporis

References

 
 
Taiwan
Taiwan